Lake Porkchop is a lake near the middle of Roaring Valley, having the shape similar to that of a pork chop. Given this descriptive name by the New Zealand Victoria University of Wellington Antarctic Expedition (VUWAE), 1960–61.

Lakes of Victoria Land
Scott Coast